Cedar Creek is a  long 1st order tributary to the Cape Fear River in Harnett County, North Carolina.  This stream forms the southwestern boundary of Raven Rock State Park.

Course
Cedar Creek rises about 1 mile north of Ryes, North Carolina and then flows northeast to join the Cape Fear River about 6 miles northeast of Rye, North Carolina.

Watershed
Cedar Creek drains  of area, receives about 47.2 in/year of precipitation, has a wetness index of 372.42 and is about 69% forested.

See also
List of rivers of North Carolina

External links
Raven Rock State Park

References

Rivers of North Carolina
Rivers of Harnett County, North Carolina
Tributaries of the Cape Fear River